Short's Brewing Company is a brewpub and microbrewery in Bellaire, Michigan, United States. Registered in 2002, the company opened its pub in 2004. In 2008, a production facility in Elk Rapids, Michigan was purchased and renovated to accommodate larger scale batches. In July 2017, Short's sold 19.9% of the company to Lagunitas Brewing Company, which is owned by Heineken International.

History
Short's Brewing Company was registered as a business in 2002 with the State of Michigan by 22-year-old Joe Short.

In 2003, a 100-year-old empty hardware store in Bellaire, Michigan was refurbished for use as a brewpub. The pub opened on April 26, 2004, initially housing a seven barrel brewing system utilizing five fermenters and five serving tanks. First year production totaled 178 barrels. During the fall of 2006, Short began work on The Imperial Beer Series. By 2007 the 13 series beers were released, each one with its own trading card and story. The pub offers space for community gatherings, local art, and live performance. The pub has 20 beers and Starcut Ciders on tap.

Short's purchased an old manufacturing building in Elk Rapids, Michigan in January 2008, to accommodate larger scale batches separate from the brewing done on-site at the brewpub. The first Elk Rapids batch of beer was brewed in January 2009. With the Elk Rapids warehouse facilities, production capacity increased to 30,000 barrels per year. The bottling line is designed to process 800 cases per day.

In 2014, the company set a Guinness World Record for the largest tap takeover when it served 120 Short's beers for the opening of HopCat's new location in Detroit. In 2014 the company produced 34,443 barrels.

Production site
The Elk Rapids production site is a 30-barrel brewhouse. The site has 21 fermenters and 6 bright tanks. Short's beer is brewed with natural ingredients and is unfiltered. Every bottled product and some kegs are flash pasteurized. The production site is geared to brew and package 56 different beers in 2014.

Availability
The beer is distributed mostly in Michigan, and is sold in over 3,200 locations statewide. In addition to its year-round "flagship" brews, it bottles over 40 seasonal and specialty beers annually. In January 2016, Short's announced that it would expand its distribution territory for both brands (Short's Brew and Starcut Ciders) to include additional states. In March 2016, Short's began distribution in Indiana and Ohio markets through Cavalier Distributing. In January 2019, Short's partnered with Cavalier Distributing in the greater Orlando area and J.J. Taylor Distributing Florida, Inc. in the greater Tampa area to bring Short's brews to Florida

Awards
2009 Great American Beer Festival
 Bloody Beer - Silver Medal - Experimental Beer

2010 RateBeer Best Beers In The World 
 #64 - 100 Best Brewers in The World
 #5 - 50 Best Brewpubs

2010 Great American Beer Festival
Key Lime Pie- Gold Medal- Experimental Beer

2010 World Beer Cup 
 Black Licorice Lager- Bronze Medal- Herb & Spice Beer or Chocolate Beer

2011 Draft Magazine Top 25 Beers of the Year 
 The Gambler
2014 Great American Beer Festival
Key Lime Pie- Gold Medal- Experimental Beer
2015 Great American Beer Festival 
 Melt My Brain - Silver Medal - Experimental Beer

Notes

External links
 

Beer brewing companies based in Michigan
American companies established in 2004
2004 establishments in Michigan